Jimmy Weston's Restaurant & Jazz Club was an American restaurant and jazz club in New York City, located on East 56th Street beginning in 1963, then, seven years later, moved it to 131 East 54th Street. Tommy Furtado was selected as the house musician and maintained that position until the club closed twenty years later. Its owner, Jimmy Weston (James L. Weston; 1922–1997), closed it in 1989.  The New York Times obituary for Weston stated "Given the restaurant's high-level clientele, it was inevitable that it served as a backdrop for social history. It was at Weston's that Mr. Sinatra patched up his feud with Liz Smith, and Howard Cosell got the call from Roone Arledge telling him he had been picked for a daring new idea called "Monday Night Football." Notable employees 
 George Pappas, maitre d' ''
 Joe Rivera
 "Boots"
 Dino Pavlou
 Jim Charkalis
 Billy Mack

Selected history 
On February 28, 1977, Onwest, Inc., doing business as Jimmy Weston's Restaurant, filed a petition for Chapter 11 Bankruptcy, Southern District of New York.

Sister restaurant in Spring Lake, New Jersey 
In 1977, Weston and a partner, Billy Keegan, purchased Jack Sullivan's Lodge, a restaurant at the corner of Morris and Fifth Avenues in Spring Lake, New Jersey, remodeled it, renamed it "Jimmy Weston's," and operated it on the same model its counterpart in New York, alternating performers between the two.

Notable performers at the New York location 
Tommy Furtado trio was the house band. 
Woody Allen's Band, which made its debut in 1970, played an engagement at Weston's in New York.

References 

Defunct drinking establishments in Manhattan
Defunct jazz clubs in New York City
Defunct restaurants in New York City
Restaurants established in 1963
1963 establishments in New York City
1989 disestablishments in New York (state)